Proeulia rucapillana is a species of moth of the family Tortricidae. It is found in Araucanía Region, Chile.

The wingspan is 14 mm. The ground colour of the forewings is cream white, in distal half of the wing mixed with pale ochreous. The hindwings are brownish grey with some cream spots.

Etymology
The species name refers to the type locality.

References

Moths described in 2010
Proeulia
Moths of South America
Taxa named by Józef Razowski
Endemic fauna of Chile